Aliabad-e Pirdusti (also Romanized as ‘Alīābād-e Pīrdūstī; also known as ‘Alīābād) is a village in Itivand-e Shomali Rural District, Kakavand District, Delfan County, Lorestan Province, Iran. At the 2006 census, its population was 38, in 5 families.

References 

Towns and villages in Delfan County